Mao Yuan (茅沅, 1926–October 10, 2022) was a Chinese composer. He was for many years one of the resident composers of the CNOH producing such works as the 1966 geju The Great Wall of the South Seas, co-composed with Ma Fei. In 1982 the Houston Ballet commissioned the ballet The Bamboo Painter, Zheng Banqiao.

References

1926 births
2022 deaths
Chinese male composers
Chinese composers